This article contains information about the literary events and publications of 1812.

Events
January 2 – Samuel Taylor Coleridge's lecture on Hamlet is given as part of a series of lectures on drama and Shakespeare; it has influenced Hamlet studies ever since. 
January 15 – Lord Byron takes his seat in the Parliament of the United Kingdom.
March 20 – First two cantos of Byron's poem Childe Harold's Pilgrimage are published in London by John Murray. This sells out in five days, giving rise to Byron's comment "I awoke one morning and found myself famous."
May–July – The library of the Duke of Roxburghe (died 1804) is auctioned in London. On June 17 a presumed first edition of Boccaccio's Decameron, printed by Christopher Valdarfer of Venice in 1471, is sold to the Marquis of Blandford for £2,260, the highest price ever given for a book at that time. This is followed by a social meeting of bibliophiles under the chairmanship of 2nd Earl Spencer, the origin of the Roxburghe Club, formed by Thomas Frognall Dibdin.
June 24–December 14 – The French invasion of Russia will form the climax of Tolstoy's 1869 novel War and Peace and feature several other works of literature.
October 10 – The rebuilt Theatre Royal, Drury Lane in London opens.
December 9–20 – Leigh Hunt is tried and convicted of libel for calling the Prince Regent "a violator of his word, a libertine over head and ears in debt and disgrace" in The Examiner on March 22.
December 26 – Novelist Frederick Marryat is promoted to lieutenant after distinguished service at sea in the War of 1812.

New books

Fiction
Sarah Burney – Traits of Nature
Maria Edgeworth:
The Absentee
Emilie de Coulanges
Vivian
Jean-Baptiste Benoît Eyriès – Fantasmagoriana
The Brothers Grimm – Grimm's Fairy Tales, volume 1 (Kinder- und Hausmärchen)
Ann Hatton – The Fortress del Vechii
Frances Margaretta Jacson (misascribed to Mary Brunton) – Things by their Right Names
Charles Maturin – The Milesian Chief
Rebecca Rush – Kelroy
George Soane – The Eve of San Marco
Louisa Stanhope – The Confessional of Valombre
Elizabeth Thomas – The Vindictive Spirit
Jane West – The Loyalists: An Historical Novel

Children and young people
Barbara Hofland – The History of a Clergyman's Widow and Her Young Family
Johann David Wyss – The Swiss Family Robinson

Drama
Joanna Baillie – Orra
Theodor Körner
Die Braut (The Bride)
Der grüne Domino (The Green Domino)
Der Nachtwächter (The Night Watchman)
Zriny
Adam Oehlenschläger – Stærkodder
August von Kotzebue – Der arme Poet (The Poor Poet)

Poetry
Anna Laetitia Barbauld – Eighteen Hundred and Eleven
Lord Byron – Childe Harold's Pilgrimage
Percy Bysshe Shelley – The Devil's Walk: A Ballad
James and Horace Smith (anonymously) – Rejected Addresses
William Tennant – Anster Fair

Non-fiction
John Galt – Cursory Reflections on Political and Commercial Topics
Georg Wilhelm Friedrich Hegel – Die objektive Logik
Sir Richard Colt Hoare – The Ancient History of South Wiltshire
Mirza Abu Taleb Khan  – Masir Talib fi Bilad Afranji (The Travels of Taleb in the Regions of Europe)
James Maitland, 8th Earl of Lauderdale – The Depreciation of the Paper-currency of Great Britain Proved
John Nichols – The Literary Anecdotes of the 18th Century, volume 1
Percy Bysshe Shelley – Declaration of Rights

Births
February 7 – Charles Dickens, English novelist and editor (died 1870)
February 15 – Chandos Wren-Hoskyns (Chandos Hoskyns), English agricultural author and landowner (died 1876)
February 19 – Zygmunt Krasiński, Polish poet (died 1859)
May 7 – Robert Browning, English poet (died 1889)
May 12 – Edward Lear, English nonsense poet, caricaturist and painter (died 1888)
June 9 – Camilla Dufour Crosland, English writer and poet  (died 1895)
June 18 – Ivan Goncharov, Russian novelist and critic (died 1891)
June 27 – Andrei Mocioni, Hungarian/Romanian journalist and literary patron (died 1880)
July 5 – Antonio García Gutiérrez, Spanish dramatist (died 1884)
August 22 – Geraldine Jewsbury, English novelist and woman of letters (died 1880)
September 16 – Anna Louisa Geertruida Bosboom-Toussaint, Dutch novelist (died 1886)
October 29 – Louise Granberg, Swedish playwright (died 1907)
December 3 – Hendrik Conscience, Flemish novelist (died 1883)
December 10 – Caroline M. Sawyer, American poet, writer, and editor (died 1894)
December 23 – Samuel Smiles, Scottish self-help author (died 1904)

Deaths
February 13 – Jacques Marie Boutet, French dramatist and actor (born 1745)
February 24 – Hugo Kołłątaj, Polish historian and philosopher (born 1750)
March 18 – John Horne Tooke, English controversialist and cleric (born 1736)
March 24 – Johann Jakob Griesbach, German Biblical commentator (born 1745)
May 12 – Martha Ballard, American diarist (born c. 1734)
July 14 – Christian Gottlob Heyne, German librarian and classicist (born 1729)
October 28 – Susanna Duncombe, English poet and painter (born 1725)
November 11 – Platon Levshin, Russian church historian (born 1737)
November 16 – John Walter, English founder of The Times, London (born c. 1738)
December 22 – Pierre Henri Larcher, French classicist and archeologist (born 1726)
unknown date – Zalkind Hourwitz, Polish essayist (born 1738)

References

 
Years of the 19th century in literature